Francine Tiffany Baron of Grand Bay, Dominica is Dominican beauty pageant winner who won Miss Dominica 2014.

References

Dominica models
Living people
Year of birth missing (living people)